(Karl) Ludwig Rütimeyer (born February 26, 1825 in Biglen, Canton of Bern; died November 25, 1895 in Basel) was a Swiss zoologist, anatomist and paleontologist, who is considered one of the fathers of zooarchaeology.

Career

Rütimeyer studied at the University of Bern. He began his studies in theology before switching to medicine. Additional studies in Paris, London, and Leyden were in natural science. Ultimately, he got a habilitation from Bern, becoming the professor of zoology and comparative anatomy at the University of Basel. An area of specialization was the extinct fauna of Switzerland. Another area was the history of various mammalian species. His work in zooarchaeology included a report in 1861 about the remains of fish and domesticated animals from Swiss palafitte settlements.

Rütimeyer was an advocate of evolution but rejected natural selection and held anti-materialist views. In the 1860s from his studies of mammal teeth, he placed fossil mammals in some of the first evolutionary lineages. Rütimeyer wrote a supportive review of Charles Darwin's The Descent of Man and defended Darwin's ideas. However, Ernst Haeckel described Rütimeyer as a "half-Darwinist" and criticized him for his anti-materialist views. Rütimeyer was an advocate of neo-Lamarckian evolution.

In 1868, he was the first scientist to criticize Haeckel's embryo drawings, which had been used as justification for the development of recapitulation theory.

He was elected as a member to the American Philosophical Society in 1869.

Publications

 Lebende und fossile Schweine, 1857
 Beiträge zur Kenntniss der fossilen Pferde, 1863 and 1878
 Die Rinder der Tertiärepoche, 1878
 Crania helvetica, 1864
 Die Grenzen der Thierwelt, 1868
 Beiträge zur Naturgeschichte der Hirschfamilie, 1882

References

1825 births
1895 deaths
Lamarckism
People from Bern-Mittelland District
19th-century Swiss zoologists
University of Bern alumni